The British Journal of Cancer is a twice-monthly professional medical journal owned by Cancer Research UK (a registered charity in the United Kingdom), published on their behalf by Springer Nature's Nature Research.

The British Journal of Cancer (BJC) provides a forum for clinicians and scientists to communicate original research findings that have relevance to understanding the etiology of cancer and to improving patient treatment and survival. Once accepted, papers are published in print and online.

Full research papers are published under six broad headings:
 Clinical studies
 Translational therapeutics
 Molecular diagnostics
 Genetics and genomics
 Cellular and molecular biology
 Epidemiology

Ranking
According to the Journal Citation Reports, the journal received an impact factor of 7.64, ranking it 39th journals in the category of Oncology. SJR ranked BJC as 30th journal in cancer research with H-index 224.

Indexing
BJC is a top cited general cancer journal committed to publishing cutting edge discovery, translational and clinical cancer research. The journal is indexed in:

See also
 Cancer in the United Kingdom
 List of medical journals

References

External links
 
 Cancer Research UK- General Portal (for the General Public)
 Cancer Research UK- Scientific Portal (for scientists and medical professionals)
 Protection against sunburn (in German)

Oncology journals
Publications established in 1947
Cancer in the United Kingdom
1947 establishments in the United Kingdom
Nature Research academic journals
Delayed open access journals